Richard Lam Chun-Keung (21 January 1948 – 16 November 2003) was a Cantopop lyricist with several hundred Cantopop songs to his name, and a columnist for Apple Daily and Next Magazine in Hong Kong.

  	 

1949 births
2003 deaths
Cantopop artists
Hong Kong columnists
Hong Kong lyricists
Hong Kong musicians
Hong Kong songwriters
University of California, Berkeley alumni
Hong Kong people of Hakka descent
People from Huizhou
Hakka musicians